Stephen Burpee Appleby (1836 – December 10, 1903) was a Canadian politician and lawyer.

Appleby was born in Florenceville, New Brunswick. In 1864, Appleby married Harriet Elizabeth Estey. He was called to the New Brunswick bar in 1869. Appleby practised law in Woodstock, New Brunswick. He was first elected to the House of Commons of Canada as a member of the Liberal Party in an 1873 by-election held in the riding of Carleton after the death of Charles Connell. Appleby was reelected in the 1874 general election. He was defeated in the 1878 election by Connell's son George Heber Connell.

In 1900, Appleby returned to politics as a member of the Legislative Assembly of New Brunswick.

Electoral record 

By-election on Mr Connell's death, June 28, 1873.

Notes
1. Carleton County sent three representatives to the Legislative Assembly during Appleby's tenure. In 1903, Frank Smith and Wendell P. Jones succeeded Appleby and Hugh H. McCain. The third member, James Kidd Flemming, was reelected.

References 

1836 births
1903 deaths
19th-century Canadian lawyers
Liberal Party of Canada MPs
Members of the House of Commons of Canada from New Brunswick